Dakhna may refer to:

Dakhna, Pakistan, village in Khyber-Pakhtunkhwa province of Pakistan
An alternate spelling of Dəhnə (disambiguation), the name of several communities in Azerbaijan